The Royal Family is an American sitcom television series that ran on CBS between September 18, 1991 and May 13, 1992. The series was created by executive producer Eddie Murphy, as part of a development deal Murphy had with CBS, and produced by David Garber, Shelley Jensen, Deborah Leschin, Leslie Ray, and David Steven Simon. Other executive producers alongside Eddie Murphy are Mark McClafferty and Greg Antonacci. It was presented by Eddie Murphy Television in association with Paramount Television, the television arm of Paramount Pictures, a Paramount Communications Company, with which Murphy had long been associated. The series starred Redd Foxx and Della Reese.

Murphy had previously worked with Foxx and Reese in the 1989 film Harlem Nights, which Murphy wrote and directed. The working title for the series was Chest Pains.

Premise
The series chronicled the lives of Atlanta mail carrier Alexander Alphonso "Al" Royal (Redd Foxx) and his wife Victoria (Della Reese), who were anticipating peaceful retirement years until marital problems brought an extended visit from their daughter Elizabeth (Mariann Aalda) and her three children: Kim (Sylver Gregory), Curtis (Larenz Tate), and Hillary (Naya Rivera).

Redd Foxx's death and aftermath
The Royal Family was intended as a comeback vehicle for Foxx, who had not had a successful television series since the cancellation of Sanford and Son in 1977. Ratings for the early episodes were high. However, the show suffered an enormous blow when, on October 11, 1991, Foxx suffered a massive heart attack while rehearsing. Joshua Rich of Entertainment Weekly later wrote, "It was an end so ironic that for a brief moment cast mates figured Foxx—whose 1970s TV character often faked heart attacks—was kidding when he grabbed a chair and fell to the floor." Foxx was taken to  Queen of Angels Hollywood Presbyterian Medical Center, where he died that evening.

The show's producers eventually decided to resume work on the series, running commercials in Foxx's memory that included the line "Like any family, The Royal Family will go on." Jackée Harry was added to the cast as Victoria's younger sister Ruth, who moved in to help the family cope with Al's sudden death. She was introduced in the series' eighth episode, which was written to deal with Al Royal's passing. 
After that episode, The Royal Family was placed on hiatus so the writers could rework the series. When the show returned in April 1992, Harry's role had been reworked; instead of Victoria's sister, she was now the Royals' eldest daughter, CoCo. The ratings of the revived Royal Family did not match those of episodes featuring Foxx, and CBS cancelled the series a week before the broadcast of its first season was scheduled to end, leaving two episodes unaired. Those two episodes would finally air 27 years later, when classic TV-focused multicast network Decades aired them in 2019.

Cast
Redd Foxx as Alexander Alphonso Royal  
Della Reese as Victoria Royal
Mariann Aalda as Elizabeth Royal Winston
Sylver Gregory	as Kim Winston
Larenz Tate as Curtis Winston
Naya Rivera as Hillary Winston
Jackée Harry as Ruth "CoCo" Royal 
Barry Shabaka Henley as Willis Tillis

Episodes

Awards and nominations

References

External links

 
The Ironic Death of Redd Foxx Part Three

1991 American television series debuts
1992 American television series endings
1990s American sitcoms
1990s American black sitcoms
CBS original programming
English-language television shows
Television series by CBS Studios
Television shows set in Atlanta